Sargassaceae is a family of brown algae in the order Fucales.

See also
Carpophyllum maschalocarpum
Halidrys siliquosa

References

Further reading

External links
 Sargassaceae at Algaebase

Fucales
Brown algae families